Mary Manning may refer to:

Mary Manning (artist) (1853–1930), Irish painter and teacher
Mary Manning (writer) (1905–1999), Irish novelist, playwright and film critic
M. Lisa Manning (born 1980), American physicist
Mary Emma Manning (1869–1936), better known as May Lillie, American sharpshooter and equestrian

See also
Mary Mannering (1876–1953), English actress
Marie Manning (disambiguation)